Jake Paul vs. Ben Askren was a professional boxing match between YouTuber Jake Paul and former mixed martial artist Ben Askren. The bout took place on April 17, 2021, at the Mercedes-Benz Stadium in Atlanta, Georgia. Paul won the bout via TKO in one minute and 59 seconds of the first round. The fight sold 500,000 PPV buys.

Background

The fight was announced on December 22, 2020, along with tentative plans to hold the match in Los Angeles. It was later announced that the venue had been changed to the Mercedes-Benz Stadium in Atlanta. The event was held with limited attendance, consisting of 100 spectators who won tickets via promotions on the Triller app. The fight was executive produced by actress and producer Malea Rose who also served as the creative director for the events overall vision. 

On Mike Tyson's podcast, UFC President Dana White stated that he would be willing to bet $1 million on Jake Paul losing to Askren. Jake Paul responded to White's statement with excitement, and offered to double the wager. Rapper Snoop Dogg also responded to Dana White's declaration, offering to bet $2 million on Jake Paul winning the fight.

Fight card

Broadcasting

The card was the inaugural event of Triller Fight Club, a new series of boxing events promoted by the video sharing app Triller (who had previously partnered with Legends Only League for 2020's Mike Tyson vs. Roy Jones Jr.) and rapper Snoop Dogg. The pay-per-view featured a similar mix of sports- and entertainment-oriented content to the Tyson vs. Jones PPV, including musical performances by The Black Keys, Diplo, Doja Cat, Justin Bieber, Major Lazer, Saweetie, and Mt. Westmore—a supergroup of Snoop Dogg, Ice Cube, Too $hort and E-40. Triller also streamed PRBLM CHILD, a documentary series hyping the fight.

The PPV was distributed via cable and satellite television providers in the United States and Canada, and also via the combat sports streaming service Fite TV (which was acquired by Triller during the direct lead-up to the fight).

Fight details 
The bout was criticized by many pundits and combat sports athletes alike, as the retired MMA fighter Askren was known for succeeding in the octagon due to his grappling, and was widely regarded as one of the worst strikers in the sport. Aside from that, Askren, who had retired from the sport of MMA and was 36 at the time, had had a hip replacement in the months prior to signing the contract of the bout.

In a contest between the younger and taller Paul and the more experienced athlete Askren, Paul worked his jab to keep Askren outside. Brent Brookhouse for CBS said Askren "looked stiff and robotic" in the early portion of the fight. Paul landed with an overhand right halfway through the first round, with Askren falling straight legged to the canvas. Although Askren rose to his feet soon after, the referee called off the fight, with Askren showing some unsteadiness. After the fight, Askren commented that the stoppage was called too early, but otherwise seemed to be happy with the outcome.'

Pay-per-view numbers 
The bout at $49.99 sold an approximate 1.5 million pay-per-view buys, though executives such as Dana White has cast doubt on the Triller Fight Club reports. In July 2022, Jake Paul (in a message to Conor McGregor) would reveal the fight actually sold 500,000 PPV buys.

Fight purses 
According to the Georgia Athletic and Entertainment Commission, Paul earned an official purse of $690,000 and Askren a $500,000 purse. These figures don't include any additional bonuses or PPV profits.

Guaranteed base purses

 Jake Paul ($690,000) vs. Ben Askren ($500,000)
 Ivan Redkach ($250,000) vs. Regis Prograis ($850,000)
 Frank Mir ($350,000) vs. Steve Cunningham ($150,000)
 Andres "Reykon" Londono ($80,000) vs. Joe Fournier ($220,000)
 Jeyson Minda ($8,000) vs. Junior Younan ($25,000)
 William Jackson ($8,000) vs. Quinton Randall ($15,000)

References

Crossover boxing events
Boxing matches in Atlanta
Pay-per-view boxing matches
2021 in boxing